Jean-René Ledru (born in 1948) is a French former rugby league player, who played as .

Biography 
He played for Avignon and then, for Marseille. He also represented France at the 1968 Rugby League World Cup, where he also played the final lost against Australia.

Honours 

 Rugby league :
 World Cup : 
 Runner-up in 1968 (France).

 French Championship : 
 1 time finalist in 1973 (Marseille).

 Lord Derby Cup : 
 1 time finalist in 1975 (Marseille).

International caps

Cap details

References

External links 
Jean-René Ledru at rugbyleagueproject.com

1948 births
Living people
France national rugby league team players
French rugby league players
Marseille XIII players
Rugby league second-rows
Rugby league wingers
Sporting Olympique Avignon players